Sir James Graham, 1st Baronet  (April 1761 – 13 April 1824) was a British Tory politician.

Early life
James was born in April 1761. He was a son of The Rev. Robert Graham and Frances Graham. Among his siblings was Margaret Graham (Wife of Fergus Francis Holmes), Catherine Graham (Wife of Thomas Garforth) and younger brother, Fergus Graham. He had an elder brother, Charles, who predeceased their father leaving only a daughter, who married John Webb Wetson, Esq.

His paternal grandfather was the Very Rev. William Graham, fourth son of the Sir George Graham, 2nd Baronet, of Esk. His uncle, Charles Graham, was the father of the Rev. Sir William Graham, 6th Baronet, of Esk. His maternal grandfather was Sir Reginald Graham, 4th Baronet, of Norton Conyers.

Career
He was created Baronet of Netherby in the County of Cumberland in the Baronetage of Great Britain on 15 January 1783. He later represented Ripon in the House of Commons.

Personal life
On 28 September 1781 Graham married Lady Catherine Stewart, the eldest of sixteen children of John Stewart, 7th Earl of Galloway and the former Anne Dashwood. Among her siblings were George Stewart, 8th Earl of Galloway, William Stewart, Susan Spencer-Churchill, Duchess of Marlborough, Bishop Charles Stewart, Edward Stewart, James Stewart. Together, they were the parents of:

 Sir James Graham, 2nd Baronet (1792–1861), a prominent statesman who served under Lord John Russell as Home Secretary from 1841 to 1846.
 Caroline Graham (1793–1870), who married Sir Wilfrid Lawson, 1st Baronet, of Brayton.
 George Graham, who married Maria Hassell, youngest daughter of Edward Hassell, Esq.
 Elizabeth Anne Graham, who married The Rev. William Waddilove, only surviving son of Darley Waddilove, the Dean of Ripon.
 Charlotte Graham (d. 1873), who married Sir George Musgrave, 10th Baronet.
 Harriet Anne Graham, who married Capt. Frederick Madan of the Royal Navy.

Sir James died on 1824. His widow died on 20 September 1836.

References

External links 
 
 Sir James Graham, 1st Baronet of Netherby (1761–1824), attributed to William Grimaldi, at National Trust Collections

1753 births
1824 deaths
Tory MPs (pre-1834)
Members of the Parliament of the United Kingdom for Scottish constituencies
Members of the Parliament of the United Kingdom for English constituencies
British MPs 1796–1800
UK MPs 1802–1806
UK MPs 1806–1807
Baronets in the Baronetage of the United Kingdom